This list of University of Puerto Rico, Rio Piedras people includes alumni and faculty affiliated with UPRRP.

Notable alumni of University of Puerto Rico, Rio Piedras

Notable faculty

References

.people
Puerto Rico, Rio Pedras